Valerie Miller is a judge currently serving on the Tax Court of Canada.

References

Living people
Black Nova Scotians
Canadian Christians
Schulich School of Law alumni
Judges of the Tax Court of Canada
Lawyers in Nova Scotia
St. Francis Xavier University alumni
Canadian women lawyers
Tax lawyers
Canadian women judges
Year of birth missing (living people)